Spiderleg Records was an independent record label founded by UK anarcho-punk band Flux of Pink Indians in 1981.

The band set up the label after releasing their first EP on the Crass Records label, which taught them the skills necessary to run such a project and provided them with the seed cash. In turn, the band not only used the label to release their own material, but gave opportunities to like-minded punk bands to put out records, including The Subhumans, who in a similar fashion set up the Bluurg label. Others that released records on Spiderleg included The System, Amebix and Antisect.

The first record to be put out was a re-recording of older material made when the band were known as The Epileptics (they changed the name to EPI-X following complaints from the British Epilepsy Association and eventually emerged as Flux of Pink Indians having reverted to The Epileptics and then The Licks). This was an EP entitled 1970s Have Been Made in Hong Kong, which had originally been released by the small Bishop's Stortford based label Stortbeat. However, the band fell into dispute with Stortbeat when the label allegedly re-released the single without paying the band owed royalties. The re-recording is also notable for featuring Penny Rimbaud of Crass on drums as the original Epileptics drummer was not available.

The label had considerable indie chart success, with several hits on the UK Indie Chart, including a number one album with Flux of Pink Indians' Strive To Survive Causing The Least Suffering Possible, which also reached number 79 on the UK Album Chart.

Derek Birkett, bass player of Flux of Pink Indians, later set up the highly successful label One Little Indian Records, now known as One Little Independent Records, whose releases have included material by Björk, The Shamen, Skunk Anansie, Queen Adreena and Chumbawamba, amongst others.

Releases
chart positions shown from the UK Indie Chart
 SDL 1 - The Epileptics: 1970s Have Been Made in Hong Kong EP (#21)
 SDL 2 - The Epileptics: Last Bus to Debden live 7" (#17)
 SDL 3 - The Subhumans: Demolition War EP (#13)
 SDL 4 - The System: Warfare EP (#18)
 SDL 5 - The Subhumans: Reasons for Existence EP (#11)
 SDL 6 - Amebix: Who's the Enemy EP (#33)
 SDL 7 - The Subhumans: Religious Wars EP (#7)
 SDL 8 - Flux of Pink Indians: Strive to Survive Causing Least Suffering Possible LP (#1)
 SDL 9 - The Subhumans: The Day the Country Died LP (#3)
 SDL 10 - Amebix: Winter 7" (#18)
 SDL 11 - The System: The System Is Murder 7" (#16)
 SDL 12 - Kronstadt Uprising: The Unknown Revolution EP
 SDL 13 - Flux of Pink Indians: The Fucking Cunts Treat Us Like Pricks double LP (#2)
 SDL 14 - Amebix: No Sanctuary 12 inch EP (#9)
 SDL 15 - Antisect: In Darkness There Is No Choice LP (#3)
 SDL 16 - Flux of Pink Indians: Taking a Liberty EP (#5)

See also 
 List of record labels
 List of independent UK record labels
 One Little Indian Records

References

Further reading
Glasper, Ian (2006) The Day the Country Died: A History of Anarcho Punk 1980 to 1984, Cherry Red Books,

External links
Spiderleg Records at the anarcho-punk archive

Defunct record labels of the United Kingdom
British independent record labels
Record labels established in 1981